Streptomyces mutabilis is a bacterium species from the genus of Streptomyces which has been isolated from soil. Streptomyces mutabilis produces the antibiotic mutalomycin.

See also 
 List of Streptomyces species

References

Further reading

External links
Type strain of Streptomyces mutabilis at BacDive -  the Bacterial Diversity Metadatabase	

mutabilis
Bacteria described in 1958